The first generation Honda City (Honda Jazz in Europe) was a subcompact hatchback aimed mainly at the Japanese domestic market. The somewhat uniquely designed City, referred to by Honda as "Tall Boy" style, was also marketed abroad and was available in a number of versions. First introduced in November 1981, it carried the model codes AA for sedans, VF for vans, and FA for the widetrack Turbo II and Cabriolets. It was sold at the Honda Japan dealership sales channel called Honda Clio.

History

While the City's layout was traditional for its category, with front-wheel drive and a transversely mounted engine, its relatively upright seating arrangement was innovative, creating legroom comparable to larger cars. This, combined with class leading fuel economy led to it being a rapid and considerable success in the Japanese domestic market. In spite of the creativity and novelty of its design, the City was narrowly pipped for the Japanese motoring journalists' Car Of The Year Award by the luxurious Toyota Soarer. The engine was the CVCC-II 1,231 cc four-cylinder "ER", specifically designed for the City. It was also available together with the Motocompo, a special 50 cc 'foldaway' scooter constructed to fit in the City's small luggage area, itself designed around the Motocompo. Originally a sportier R version, the economical E and two commercial van versions ("Pro") were introduced. In September 1982 a turbocharged version of the Honda ER engine was added to the lineup.

Designed by Pininfarina and introduced in August 1984, a drop-top Cabriolet utilized the wider track, fenders, and bigger bumpers of the Turbo II "Bulldog", but was only normally available with the naturally aspirated  engine. These widetrack models were designated "FA" rather than "AA". The Cabriolet was well equipped, with a glass rear window and twelve pastel colors not available on the hatchback versions. Part of a worldwide eighties' wave of convertibles based on family cars, this was the first car of this kind built in Japan.

A March 1985 light facelift brought a new asymmetrical grille (although not for the Cabriolet) and some interior improvements. The E and E II models were replaced by the new E III, while a lower priced U model joined the lineup. The U was the only non-commercial City to be available with a four-speed manual in the Japanese domestic market. Naturally aspirated engines in the AA Citys also gained a new fiber-reinforced aluminum alloy connecting rods ("FRM"), a world first in series production. One month later, the R became available with the interesting Hypershift transmission, a four-speed with an electronically controlled overdrive on second, third, and fourth gears - in essence creating a 7-speed gearbox.

In addition to vans and convertibles, there was also an "R Manhattan Roof" version with a 10 cm taller roof. A "R Manhattan Sound" version incorporated high-quality stereo equipment (including the "Bodysonic", transmitting sound vibrations through the seat). The E-series (E, E 1, E II & EIII; "E" for economy) used higher geared transmissions and trip computers to increase gas mileage. The E III, in addition to benefiting from the FRM conrods, also had an electronically variable lean-burn engine. First generation production ended in late 1986 with the introduction of the GA type City.

City Pro (VF)
Commercial versions were called Pro in Japan, and were available with either two or five seats (Pro T/F). The Pro had to make do without brake boost (until the 1985 facelift) and transistorized ignition (lowering power by two horsepower), and were also not available with the five speed manual transmission. The bare-bones Pro also had a manual choke.

Exports
Exports of the City were only of naturally aspirated hatchback and van versions. In Europe it was renamed Honda Jazz, due to Opel having the rights to the City name after having used it on a hatchback version of the Kadett C. It was marketed in Europe from 1982 to 1986, but was generally priced too high to compete. The European Jazz was only classified as a four-seater, and offered either  depending on fuel grade. In early 1985 a Hondamatic-equipped variant also entered the European market.

The City was also sold in Australia (in two seater 'van' form, to circumvent Australian import restrictions and design regulations on passenger vehicles at the time) and New Zealand (where it was locally assembled). The Australian-spec model claimed  at 5000 rpm, on Super fuel with 10.2:1 compression and fitted with a twin-throat carburetor.

City Turbo

The Honda City Turbo was a sport compact / hot hatch produced by Japanese automaker Honda between September 1982 and 1986, based on the naturally aspirated Honda City AA. For a long time the City Turbo was one of the few non-kei car Hondas to be equipped with a turbocharged engine.

The City Turbo was the brainchild of Hirotoshi Honda, son of Honda founder Soichiro Honda as well as founder and owner of Mugen. In the early 1980s Mugen was a small tuning company that was beginning to make its mark producing performance parts for motorcycles and automobiles, but was yet to gain recognition outside of racing circles. When he created the City Turbo, Hirotoshi took one of Honda's most unassuming vehicles and successfully turned it into an aggressive street rocket, considered to be well ahead of its time. Impressed, Honda took Hirotoshi's idea and made a production version, introduced in September 1982. A few months earlier, Honda staffers took two City Turbos on a gruelling 10,000 km round trip of Europe, all the way from Sicily to Karasjok in the Arctic north.

In November 1983, the intercooled Turbo II joined the lineup. Flared fenders, wings, side-skirts and graphics combined for a much more pugnacious appearance, making its "Bulldog" nickname very fitting. In late 1984 the original Turbo was discontinued (after some were built as 1985 models) while the Turbo II continued in production until the first generation City had a model refresh in late 1986.

Engine
Further changes to the engine included an aluminum/titanium alloy head and a magnesium valve cover to keep the weight down. The IHI RHB51 turbocharger, developed as a joint venture between Ishikawajima Heavy Industry and Honda, was lighter and smaller than most other turbos and could run at higher rpm. When combined with Honda's PGM-FI manifold injection and an 8-bit digital computer control unit, the result was a very efficient engine with minimal turbo lag. 0–100 km/h was possible in 8.6 seconds.

The later City Turbo II's engine featured an intercooler, a revised intake plenum, a slightly larger throttle body, a modified inlet manifold, a higher AR turbo compressor, exhaust housings, and a slightly raised (7.6:1) compression ratio.

Chassis
The City Turbo's suspension was more refined than that of the ordinary City. The four-wheel independent system used progressive rate coil springs, with stabilizers at both the front and the rear. Tires were the 165/70HR12 radials, and it had ventilated disc brakes at the front and semi-metallic shoes at the rear. The Turbo II's flared fenders were necessary to accommodate a 30 mm (20 mm in the rear) wider track and bigger 185/60 R13 tires.

Styling and interior
The body of the Honda City Turbo was made sportier by the addition of a new air dam with fog lights and asymmetrical grille at the front and a small spoiler at the top/rear of the car. Meanwhile, a hump was added to the hood to make room for the extra equipment of the turbocharged engine. In addition to flared fenders and "Turbo II Intercooler" graphics, the Turbo II also got a bigger bump in the hood, body colored bumpers and a louver ahead of the rear wheel.

The interior appointments to the car focused both on driver involvement and comfort. A digital speedometer, surrounded by a tachometer and a boost gauge, replaced the regular analog instrument cluster, and was used until the March 1985 facelift, after which the analog assembly from the regular City was used. Form fitting, leather and moquette bucket seats were made standard as well and a special "sonic seat" was available, which responded to the audio system by a transducer sending sound and vibration to the user through the seat. An extra thick, three-spoke steering wheel was also standard Turbo fitment.

Data

In popular culture

The Madness song "In the City" by was written as a jingle for a 1981 Japanese television advertisement for the Honda City and later expanded into a 3-minute track.

In the 1984 Transformer series the car was used as an alternate mode for a character named 'Skids'.

References

 Auto Katalog 1985. Vereinigte Motor-Verlage GmbH & Co. KG, Stuttgart: 1984.

External links

Honda City Turbo's and The Beginning of Honda Endorsed Mugen Motorsports
Mugen Official Site
Honda City Turbo II factbook

Subcompact cars
Sport compact cars
Front-wheel-drive vehicles
Convertibles
Hatchbacks
1980s cars
Cars introduced in 1981
Cars discontinued in 1986